The Men's 400m T52 had its First Round held on September 11 at 20:35 and its Final on September 12 at 20:17.

Medalists

Results

References
Round 1 - Heat 1
Round 1 - Heat 2
Final

Athletics at the 2008 Summer Paralympics